Cychrus stoetzneri is a species of ground beetle in the subfamily of Carabinae. It was described by Roeschke in 1923.

References

stoetzneri
Beetles described in 1923